Fusceulima projectilabrum is a species of sea snail, a marine gastropod mollusk in the family Eulimidae.

Distribution
This species occurs in the following locations:
 European waters (ERMS scope): in the Atlantic Ocean, west of Brittany, France.

Description 
The maximum recorded shell length is 1.8 mm.

Habitat 
Minimum recorded depth is 156 m. Maximum recorded depth is 230 m.

References

 Gofas, S.; Le Renard, J.; Bouchet, P. (2001). Mollusca. in: Costello, M.J. et al. (eds), European Register of Marine Species: a check-list of the marine species in Europe and a bibliography of guides to their identification. Patrimoines Naturels. 50: 180-213

External links
 Bouchet, P. & Warén, A. (1986). Revision of the Northeast Atlantic bathyal and abyssal Aclididae Eulimidae, Epitonidae (Mollusca, Gastropoda). Bollettino Malacologico. suppl. 2: 297-576.

Eulimidae
Gastropods described in 1986